9th Regiment of Horse or 9th Horse may refer to:

 7th Dragoon Guards, ranked as 9th Horse from 1690 to 1694
 Montagu's Carabineers (raised by John Montagu, 2nd Duke of Montagu), ranked as 9th Horse from 1745 to 1746
 9th Deccan Horse